(Là) où je pars is the first solo album recorded by French singer Emmanuel Moire. It was first released on 13 November 2006, then on 21 May 2007 in its second version. Four tracks from the album were released as singles – "Le Sourire", "Ça me fait du bien", "Là où je pars" and "Si c'était ça la vie", but they were only available digitally and on airplay (except "Le Sourire", which was released as CD single and peak at number seven in France). The album achieved some success : it debuted at a peak of number eight on the French albums chart and totaled 70 weeks in the top 200. In Belgium (Wallonia), it started at number 71 on 25 November 2006 and reached number 34 seven weeks later, and fell off the top 100 after 18 weeks. The album passed almost unnoticed in Switzerland where it was ranked low for a sole week.

Track listing
 "Celui que j'étais" (Lionel Florence, Emmanuel Moire) – 3:50
 "Le Sourire" (Guillon, Benoît Poher) – 3:56
 "Je vis deux fois" (Beucher, Guillon, Moire) – 3:29
 "Là où je pars" (Davide Esposito, Guillon) – 4:34
 "Ça me fait du bien" (Cowell) – 3:33
 "Rien ni personne" (Guillon, Janois, Rousseau) – 3:49
 "La femme qu'il me faut" (Beucher, D'Aimé, Moire) – 3:32
 "La Fin" (Cosso-Merad, Moire) – 4:21
 "Si c'était ça la vie" (D'Aimé, Moire) – 4:01
 "Plus que jamais" (D'Aimé, Janois, Rousseau) – 4:08
 "Merci" (Guillon, Joseph) – 4:03
 "Le Sourire" (acoustic) (Guillon, Benoît Poher) – 4:00
 "Si c'était ça la vie" (acoustic) (D'Aimé, Moire) – 4:27

Personnel
 Recording
 Simon Hale – arranger
 Charles Mendiant – engineer, mixing, sound assistant
 Pete Schwier – mixing
 Raphaël Jonin – mastering
 Matthew Vaughan – programming

 Musicians
 Emmanuel Andre – violin
 Emmanuel Moire – piano, author, vocals
 Jean-Philippe Audin – cello
 David Braccini – violin
 Christophe Briquet – alto
 Johan Dalgaard – piano, keyboards
 Nicolas Fiszman – bass
 Maxine Garoute – percussion, drums
 Christophe Guiot – violin
 Pierre Jaconelli – guitar
 Jean Philippe Kuzma – violin
 Alain Lanty – piano
 Philippe Nadal – cello
 Daniel Vagner – alto

Charts

Weekly charts

Year-end charts

Certifications

References

2007 debut albums
Emmanuel Moire albums
Warner Music France albums
French-language albums